

The Mil Mi-54 is Twin turbine commercial utility helicopter first announced in 1992, intended to replace the Mi-2 and the Mi-8 helicopters. It was planned to use two 574 kW Saturn/Lyulka AL-32 turboshaft engines, four-bladed main and tail rotors, and fixed tricycle-type landing gear with one nosewheel and two rear wheels on sponsons.

Specifications

References

External links

Proposed aircraft of Russia
Mil aircraft
Soviet and Russian helicopters